The  is a city tram station on the Takaoka Kidō Line located in Takaoka, Toyama Prefecture, Japan.

Structure
Yoshihisa Station has one track without raised platforms. The two side platforms by the track are only indicated with white lines on the road.  

Railway stations in Toyama Prefecture